Loudermilk is an American comedy-drama television series created by Peter Farrelly and Bobby Mort that premiered on October 17, 2017 on the AT&T Audience Network.  The series stars Ron Livingston, Will Sasso, Laura Mennell, Anja Savcic, Mat Fraser, Toby Levins, and Mark Brandon.  In December 2018, it was announced that Audience had renewed the series for a third season.  In April 2020, the series was left without a home after the network ceased operations.

Amazon subsequently acquired the rights to stream the series, and the previously unaired third season was released on Amazon Prime Video in some countries, such as Canada, in December 2020.  The series made its U.S. debut in March 2021, while the third season was added the following month.

Further seasons have been conceptualized by the creators, but are as-yet unproduced, as a sponsoring (not just distribution) network is being sought.

Premise
Sam Loudermilk, a former music critic and recovering alcoholic, is a substance abuse counselor and support group leader who regularly doles out clever but acid-tongued critiques to his clients, his friends, and any random person he interacts with.  Loudermilk, who does not have his life together in the way one might expect of a counselor, is somewhat nicer to the few people close to him, including his best friend and (usually) sober sponsor, Ben Burns, and his sponsee and unplanned roommate, the young Claire Wilkes.

Cast and characters

Main
 Ron Livingston as Sam Loudermilk 
 Will Sasso as Ben Burns
 Anja Savcic as Claire Wilkes
 Laura Mennell as Allison Montgomery (Season 1)

Regulars
 Brian Regan as Winston "Mugsy"  Bennigan
 Ricky Blitt as New Guy (Hiram)
 Timothy Webber as Ed 
 Viv Leacock as Stevie
 Jackie Flynn as Tony 
 Mat Fraser as Roger Frostly
 Sam Bob as Cloud
 Tyler Layton-Olson as Cisco
 Eric Keenleyside as Father Michael 
 Danny Wattley as Cutter (Season 1)

Recurring
 Tom Butler as Jack Loudermilk
 Lissie as Lizzie Poole (Season 3)
 Benjamin Rogers as Felix Furbush
 Brendan McNamara as Tom Blitt (Season 1)
 Melinda Dahl as Annette
 Sofiya Cheyenne as Louise (Season 2)
 Anna Galvin as Jane Wilkes
 Edward Barbanell as Charlie
Cassandra Naud as Cappuccino (Season 3)

Episodes

Season 1 (2017)

Season 2 (2018)

Season 3 (2020)

Production
Loudermilk originally premiered on AT&T's Audience Network.  Its first season debuted in 2017.  On April 12, 2018, Audience renewed the series for a second season, which it premiered on October 16, 2018.  On December 5, 2018, it was announced that Audience had renewed the series for a third season, but the network ceased operations in May 2020, prior to the third season's scheduled airing.

Amazon Prime Video, who was already carrying the series in some countries outside the U.S., premiered the third season in those countries on December 31, 2020.  Amazon acquired the U.S. streaming rights for the show and made the first two seasons available there on March 12, 2021.  On April 27, 2021, the third season received its U.S. premiere on Prime.

Future
Although, in the wake of the Audience Network shutdown, the cast was released from any contractual obligations to produce further episodes, co-creator Peter Farrelly has stated that "everybody wants to come back and do Season 4", and that a production network is being sought.  While Amazon is distributing the existing seasons, to date they have not taken on a production role for further seasons.  In total, Farrelly has envisioned seven seasons' worth of plotlines and character arcs.

Reception
Review aggregator Rotten Tomatoes gives the first season an approval rating of 92% based on reviews from 12 critics, with an average rating of 7.12 out of 10.  The site's critical consensus states:
Loudermilk's timely premise and sharp writing lay a solid foundation for a strong central performance from Ron Livingston, perfectly cast in this endearing dark comedy about a rock critic turned recovering alcoholic.

Distribution
The series is distributed by Sony Pictures TV; and in Canada, Germany, Italy, the U.K., and the U.S., it airs on Amazon Prime Video.

References

External links
 Official website
 

2017 American television series debuts
2020 American television series endings
2010s American comedy-drama television series
2020s American comedy-drama television series
Amazon Prime Video original programming
Audience (TV network) original programming
English-language television shows
Television shows filmed in Vancouver
Television shows set in Seattle